Swisher may mean:

People 
 Swisher (surname), a list of people

Places in the United States 
 Swisher, Iowa, a city
 Swisher County, Texas
 Swisher Gymnasium, Jacksonville, Florida

In business 
 Swisher Hygiene Inc., a provider of cleaning and sanitizing products and services
 Swisher (company), the world's largest cigar company by number sold

Other uses 
 Swisher (album), released in 2013 by the electronic duo Blondes
 "Swishers", a 2021 song by Sabina Ddumba

See also 
 Swish (disambiguation)